Guatemala competed in the Winter Olympic Games for the first time (and as of 2018, only time) at the 1988 Winter Olympics in Calgary, Alberta, Canada.

Competitors
The following is the list of number of competitors in the Games.

Alpine skiing

Men

Women

Cross-country skiing

Men

C = Classical style, F = Freestyle

References

Official Olympic Reports
 Olympic Winter Games 1988, full results by sports-reference.com

Nations at the 1988 Winter Olympics
1988
1988 in Guatemalan sport